Xinsheng Sean Ling (born February 15, 1964) is a Chinese-American physicist and professor at Brown University. He is known for his work in condensed matter, in particular for his contributions to superconductivity, vortex physics, colloid physics, biophysics, and quantum physics. He joined the faculty of Brown University in 1996.

Biography and career 
Ling graduated from Wuhan University in 1984. He earned his M.S. from the University of Chinese Academy of Sciences in 1987 and his Ph.D. from the University of Connecticut in 1992.

He has done postdoctoral research at Yale University and the NEC Research Institute. In 1998 and 2002, he was named an Alfred P. Sloan Fellow and Guggenheim Fellow respectively. He has been a Fellow of the American Physical Society since 2005. His research areas include quantum physics of matter, colloid physics, and nanobiophysics.

References

External links

1964 births
Living people
Brown University faculty
Sloan Research Fellows
Fellows of the American Physical Society
20th-century American physicists
21st-century American physicists
Experimental physicists
Condensed matter physicists
Quantum physicists
Optical physicists
American biophysicists
American technology company founders
Businesspeople from Rhode Island
Physicists from Hubei
People from Wuhan
Chinese emigrants to the United States
Chinese biophysicists
Wuhan University alumni
University of the Chinese Academy of Sciences alumni
University of Connecticut alumni